Come Back Peter is a 1969 British sex comedy film written, produced, edited and directed by Donovan Winter. It was reissued in the UK with additional footage in 1976 under the title Some Like It Sexy.

Plot
A young Londoner called Peter (Christopher Matthews) has sexual encounters with a string of women including an au pair, a model, a high-class lady, a blues singer, a hippie, incestuous twins and a girl next door from The Salvation Army. At the end of the film, Peter is revealed to be a butcher's assistant entertaining sexual fantasies.

Cast
Christopher Matthews as Peter
Erika Bergmann as Lisa (au pair)
Penny Riley as Sue (model)
Yolande Turner as Mrs Beaufort-Smith
Madeline Smith as Mrs Beaufort-Smith's daughter
Valerie St. Helene as Cleo (blues singer)
Annabel Leventon as Creampuff (hippie)
Nicola Pagett as Jenny (Salvation Army girl)
Madeleine and Mary Collinson as Twins

Critical response
The film was negatively received by Derek Malcolm of The Guardian and Nina Hibbin of the Morning Star.

Calling the film "charmless and flashy", Nigel Andrews of The Monthly Film Bulletin criticised its "monotony" of presentation and the "vulgar tedium" of the protagonist's sexual encounters.

References

External links

1969 films
1969 comedy films
1960s sex comedy films
British sex comedy films
Films set in London
1960s English-language films
1960s British films